Roel van Overbeek (born 7 August 2000) is a Dutch basketball player who plays for the Landstede Hammers in the BNXT League.

Career
Born in Oirschot, van Overbeek played for the Basketball Academie Limburg (BAL) youth academy. He made his debut in the Dutch Basketball League (DBL) in the 2016–17 season.

In the 2018–19 season, Van Overbeek played with newly established club Dutch Windmills. The team was declared bankrupt halfway through the season, however.

In the 2019–20 season, he returned to BAL and became the starting point guard for the team, leading them in assists. In the 2020–21 season, van Overbeek reached the DBL Playoffs for the first time. On 2 May 2021, he surprisingly won the DBL Cup with BAL after defeating Yoast United in the final. Van Overbeek had 13 points and 7 assists in the championship game.

On 11 June 2022, Van Overbeek signed with Landstede Hammers.

National team career
Van Overbeek played with the Netherlands U16, U18 and U20 teams.

References

External links
RealGM profile
Proballers profile

2000 births
Living people
Basketball Academie Limburg players
Dutch Basketball League players
Dutch men's basketball players
Dutch Windmills players
Landstede Hammers players
People from Oirschot
Point guards
Sportspeople from North Brabant